Jesse Warren Douglas (March 27, 1916 – January 6, 1979) was an American Negro league infielder between 1937 and 1951.

A native of Longview, Texas, Douglas broke into the Negro leagues in 1937 with the Kansas City Monarchs. He played on several teams through the 1951 season, and was selected to play in the East–West All-Star Game in 1950. Douglas also played in the Mexican League, and from 1951 to 1958 played minor league baseball. He died in Los Angeles, California in 1979 at age 62.

References

External links
 and Seamheads

1916 births
1979 deaths
Birmingham Black Barons players
Chicago American Giants players
Kansas City Monarchs players
Memphis Red Sox players
New York Black Yankees players
People from Longview, Texas
Baseball players from Texas
20th-century African-American sportspeople
Baseball infielders